The 1973 Purdue Boilermakers football team represented Purdue University in the 1973 Big Ten Conference football season. Led by first-year head coach Alex Agase, the Boilermakers compiled an overall record of 5–6 with a mark of 4–4 in conference play, placing in a four-way tie for fourth in the Big Ten. Purdue played home games at Ross–Ade Stadium in West Lafayette, Indiana.

Schedule

Roster

Game summaries

at Wisconsin

Miami (OH)

Notre Dame

Duke

at Illinois

Northwestern

Michigan State
 Bo Bobrowski 24 rushes, 125 yards

at Iowa
 Mike Northington 31 rushes, 146 yards
 Bo Bobrowski 10 rushes, 123 yards

at Minnesota

Michigan

at Indiana
 Pete Gross 29 rushes, 174 yards
 Bo Bobrowski 17 rushes, 114 yards

References

Purdue
Purdue Boilermakers football seasons
Purdue Boilermakers football